Eleonora Carrillo is a Salvadoran model who participated in the 44th edition of Miss Universe pageant, held in Windhoek, Namibia.

Miss Universe 1995
In Miss Universe, Carrillo placed in the semifinals; making it the first time El Salvador was placed in a Miss Universe contest since Carmen Elena Figueroa's participation in 1975. Although she had the highest score in the interview session, she had the lowest score in both the swimsuit and evening gown portion, which ultimately cost her a spot in the top 6.

Personal life
Born in San Salvador, her father, son of the Salvadoran ambassador to the U.N., met her mother when he went to school in Turin. Her mother, Beatrice Alamanni de Carrillo, moved to El Salvador, was naturalized, and became human rights advocate. In 2001, she became Attorney for the Defense of Human Rights, created after the Salvadoran Civil War, until her term ended in 2007.

After doing some modeling in Italy, Carrillo currently lives in Spain and works as an attorney.

References 

Living people
Miss Universe 1995 contestants
People from San Salvador
Salvadoran beauty pageant winners
Year of birth missing (living people)
20th-century Salvadoran women